Carleton-in-Craven is a small village and civil parish in the Craven district of North Yorkshire, England, and situated just over  south-west from the market town of Skipton. The village had a population of 1,118 at the 2011 Census, and contains  a primary school, church, post office, newsagents & village store, public house, a social club, and a pharmacy.

Geographically, the village of Carleton-in-Craven is the most northern village in the South Pennines.

The spelling of the village name, with an 'e', can be seen in a record, dated 1440, mentioning Robert Mosele, a husbandman of the village, who was accused by Robert Blakey of carrying away some of the latter's goods.

Carleton Mill 

Carleton Mill dates to 1861, when it was built for spinning cotton; the mill later housed a mail-order business throughout the 1930s. During the Second World War the Rover company used the building to produce aircraft parts. Shortly after the war, the mill returned to its original use as a textile factory and later produced carpets, eventually closing in November 1999. In 2005 it was converted to luxury apartments by Novo Homes, with 51 apartments in the mill and 26 houses constructed within the grounds.

People
Susanna Lister, the illustrator, was born here at Carleton Hall in about 1670.

References

External links 

[www.carletonincravenpc.org.uk Parish Council Website]
 "Carleton in Craven, North Yorkshire", Carletonweb.co.uk, UK Individual registrant self-published web site
 Craven Website
 Carleton Endowed CE (VA) Primary School website

Villages in North Yorkshire
Civil parishes in North Yorkshire
Craven District